Pooth is a German surname. Notable people with the surname include:

 Verona Pooth (born 1968), German television personality

German-language surnames